Regent, L.P. is a multi-sector private equity firm based in Beverly Hills, California. Many of Regent's investments have been in the software, technology, consumer products, retail and media space. Its founder and chairman is Michael Reinstein.

Selected investments
Regent's first acquisition was in 2013, when the firm acquired the Rovi Entertainment Store over-the-top video platform from Rovi Corporation with an Austin, Texas-based investor. The firm later purchased the CinemaNow video business from Best Buy. Regent and its partners sold these businesses to FilmOn in 2015.

In September 2013, the firm's partners acquired control of Skinit, a San Diego-based e-commerce company from private equity firm Ares Management. Regent acquired Halco Rock Tools from Caterpillar Inc. in September 2014. The firm acquired travel technology provider Pegasus Solutions in October 2014 in a transaction that included divesting the Pegasus distribution services business to HIG Capital. Regent acquired Silicon Valley technology company NexTag in March 2015 from a consortium of investors led by Deutsche Bank.

In October 2015, Regent purchased the catalog and e-commerce company Lillian Vernon Corporation and mail order business Current, Inc. from Minnesota- based Taylor Corporation. Regent's holdings also include magazine publisher HistoryNet and the military and defense publishing company Sightline Media Group, which it bought from Tegna in 2016. Sightline Media Group publishes Armed Forces Journal, Defense News, Army Times, Navy Times, Air Force Times and Federal Times.  The Sightline business was run by Washington D.C. based media executive David Smith until 2018.

In October 2017, Regent purchased the luxury salon division of Regis Corporation which operated multiple brands including Regis, MasterCuts, Hennessey and Carlton Hair in North America and the Regis and SuperCuts brands in Europe.

On November 30, 2017 Time Inc. announced the sale of the Sunset brand to Regent LP. Sunset was founded in 1898 and serves an audience of 6.5 million across its digital, print and social platforms.

In January 2019, L Brands, parent company of Victoria's Secret, sold lingerie and sleepwear retailer La Senza to Regent.

In February 2019, Regent purchased Plainville Farms food business from American food company Hain Celestial Group.

In August 2019, Regent purchased the Diamondback Bicycles and Redline Bicycles brands as well as several other cycling businesses from Netherlands-based bicycle company Accell.

In November 2019, Regent purchased the Escada fashion house from an affiliate of multinational corporation ArcelorMittal S.A.

References

Financial services companies established in 2013
Private equity firms of the United States
American companies established in 2013
Companies based in Beverly Hills, California